João Filipe Couto Patrão (born 22 January 1990) is a Portuguese professional footballer who plays for C.D. Cova da Piedade as a midfielder.

Club career
Born in Esposende, Braga District, Patrão joined Leixões SC's youth academy in 2006 at the age of 16. He made his senior debut with amateurs Leça F.C. but quickly returned to his previous club, his first appearance as a professional occurring on 15 May 2011 when he came on as a late substitute in a 3–1 home win against S.C. Freamunde in the Segunda Liga, in his only appearance of the season.

Subsequently, Patrão continued to compete in the second division, first with S.C. Braga B then G.D. Chaves. He helped the latter return to the Primeira Liga in 2016 after a lengthy absence, contributing with 34 matches and one goal to the feat and renewing his contract shortly after.

References

External links

1990 births
Living people
People from Esposende
Portuguese footballers
Association football midfielders
Primeira Liga players
Liga Portugal 2 players
Segunda Divisão players
Leixões S.C. players
Leça F.C. players
S.C. Braga B players
G.D. Chaves players
G.D. Estoril Praia players
C.D. Cova da Piedade players
Sportspeople from Braga District